East Butterwick is a village and civil parish in North Lincolnshire, England. The population of the civil parish as at the 2011 census was 135.

References

External links

Villages in the Borough of North Lincolnshire